Rekor (Record) is the eighth studio album by Turkish singer Demet Akalın. It was released on 23 April 2014 by Seyhan Müzik.

Background and promotion
For this album, Akalın worked with a number of different artists, including Burak Yeter, Cansu Kurtcu, Ceyhun Çelikten, Erdem Kınay, Erem Yıldız, Erhan Bayrak, Emrah Karaduman, Ersay Üner, Lerzan Mutlu, Fettah Can, Gökhan Özen, Gökhan Şahin, Hakkı Yalçın and İdo Tatlıses. To promote the album, Akalın gave various concerts across Turkey, including a concert at the Bostancı Show Center in May 2014, for which she spent 70,000 on decoration and was accompanied by 30 dancers.

The album's cover was designed by Müjdat Kupsi and Özlem Semiz. Later it was revealed that Akalın's head had been photoshopped into a photo of model Carla Crombie from 2013.

Achievements and critical reception
The album sold 89,000 copies, becoming the number-one best-selling album in Turkey. Akalın recorded different music videos for the songs "İlahi Adalet", "Rekor", "Koltuk", "Nefsi Müdafaa" and "Yeminim Var". Out of these songs, the first one ranked second on Turkey's official music chart, and singer Gökhan Özen was the featuring artist on the fourth one. Music critic Yavuz Hakan Tok wrote that Akalın, who claimed that she did not have any concerns over the success of this album, was in fact trying to maintain her current popularity with the release of Rekor. Tok found this album's potential of becoming a hit low compared to Akalın's previous albums.

Track listing

Personnel 
 Supervisor: Demet Akalın
 Producer: Bülent Seyhan, Fuat Seyhan 
 Mastering: Çağlar Türkmen
 Photographs: Müjdat Küpşi
 Styling: Bener Hamamcı
 Graphic Design: Müjdat Küpşi, Özlem Semiz
 Printing: FRS
 Studios: Erdem Kınay, Han Medya (Sarı Ev), Kaya Müzik, ByRAK Records, Makara Band, Studyo Emrec

Sales

References 

Demet Akalın albums
2014 albums